The following is a list of the 47 cities and towns in Estonia. Before the Republic of Estonia became an in independent nation in 1918, many of these locations were known in the rest of the world by their German language names which were occasionally quite different from the ones used in the Estonian language. During the 1944–1991 Soviet occupation of Estonia, placenames were transliterated into Russian (Cyrillic alphabet) in the Soviet central government's documents, which in turn lead to the use of several incorrect back-transliterations from Russian (Cyrillic) alphabet into English (and other Latin alphabets) in some English-language maps and texts during the second half of the 20th century (for example, incorrect Pyarnu, Vilyandi, Pylva, instead of the correct Pärnu, Viljandi, Põlva). 

Tallinn is the capital and the most populous city of Estonia. There are 46 other linn, i.e. cities and towns in Estonia (as of 2022). The Estonian word linn means both "a city" or "a town". More than 70% of the country's population lives in the cities and towns.

List

Former towns
Ahtme, 1953–1960, 1993–1995, merged with Kohtla-Järve;
Jaanilinn (Ivangorod), 1617-1649, merged with Narva, annexed to the Russian SFSR in 1945.
Mustla, 1938-1979, town rights revoked;
Nõmme, 1926-1940, merged with Tallinn;
Petseri (Pechory), 1776-onwards, annexed to the Russian SFSR in 1945.
Toompea, 1248/1265/1288-1785, 1796-1878, merged with Tallinn;
Vana-Pärnu, 1251-1617, merged with Pärnu.

See also

Populated places in Estonia
Municipalities of Estonia
Counties of Estonia

References

External links

 
Estonia
Towns
Estonia